Arron Villaflor (born July 5, 1990) is a Filipino rapper, actor, singer, dancer, and talent of ABS-CBN. He started his career in Philippines' showbiz industry in the second season of Star Circle Quest where he finished as the runner-up. He's currently managed by Star Magic and Cornerstone Entertainment.

Filmography

Television

Film

Theater
 2008: Ibong Adarna - Don Juan
 2002: First Name - Judah

Awards and nominations

References

External links
 

1990 births
Living people
Male actors from Tarlac
Filipino male child actors
Filipino male television actors
Filipino male models
ABS-CBN personalities
Star Magic
Star Circle Quest participants
Viva Artists Agency